Dike  (minor planet designation: 99 Dike) is a quite large and dark main-belt asteroid. Dike was discovered by Alphonse Borrelly on May 28, 1868. It was his first asteroid discovery. This object is named after Dike, the Greek goddess of moral justice. Among the first hundred numbered minor planets, 99 Dike was considered anomalously faint for over a century. However, this was later found to be untrue.

This asteroid is orbiting the Sun with a period of 4.35 years and an eccentricity of 0.19. Its orbital plane is inclined by 13.8° to the plane of the ecliptic. The body spans a diameter of 69 km and it is classified as a C-type asteroid, which indicates it has a dark, carbonaceous surface. Based upon a light curve that was generated from photometric observations of this asteroid at Pulkovo Observatory, it has a rotation period of 18.127 ± 0.002 hours and varies in brightness by 0.22 ± 0.02 in magnitude. However, according to Shrindan E. (2009) the rotation period is rather of 10.360 ± 0.001 h.

The asteroid is located near the Juno clump of asteroids, but is most likely unrelated.

References

External links
 
 
Phase curve of (99) Dike

C-type asteroids (Tholen)
Xk-type asteroids (SMASS)
Mitidika asteroids
Dike
Dike
18680528